Leandro Gabriel Stillitano (born 6 February 1983) is an Argentine football manager and former player who played mainly as a midfielder.

Career
Born in Avellaneda, Stillitano played as a senior for Club Atlético Lugano and Sportivo Dock Sud before retiring. He started his managerial career in 2011, being in charge of San Martín de Burzaco.

In 2014, Stillitano was in charge of Juventud Unida for a short period, before joining Ariel Holan's staff at Banfield in January 2015, as an assistant of the youth sides. He subsequently followed Holan to Defensa y Justicia and Independiente, always as his assistant.

In January 2019, Stillitano became the manager of Independiente's reserve side. In November of that year, he joined Gustavo Quinteros' staff at Club Tijuana, as his assistant, and also followed him to Colo-Colo.

On 12 November 2022, Stillitano returned to Independiente, after being appointed manager of the club for the 2023 season. The following 18 March, he left the club on a mutual agreement.

References

External links

1983 births
Living people
Sportspeople from Avellaneda
Argentine footballers
Association football midfielders
Club Atlético Lugano players
Sportivo Dock Sud players
Argentine football managers
Club Atlético Independiente managers
Club Tijuana non-playing staff
Argentine expatriate sportspeople in Mexico
Argentine expatriate sportspeople in Chile